Acraga meridensis is a moth of the family Dalceridae. It is found in the Andes Mountains of Venezuela and Colombia. The habitat probably consists of tropical premontane and lower montane moist or wet forests.

The length of the forewings is 11–13 mm for males and 17–19 mm for females. Adults are orange-brown, the hindwings slightly paler than the forewings. Adults are on wing from April to November.

References

Dalceridae
Moths described in 1907